Shen Yan-ru (born 24 December 1998) is a Taiwanese female badminton player. She competed at the 2013 Summer Deaflympics and also in the 2017 Summer Deaflympics.

Shen went onto clinch silver medal in the women's doubles at the 2017 Summer Deaflympics partnering with Jung-Yu Fan.

References 

1998 births
Living people
Taiwanese female badminton players
Deaf badminton players
Sportspeople from Kaohsiung
Deaflympic competitors for Chinese Taipei
20th-century Taiwanese women
21st-century Taiwanese women